Maryland, Monmouthshire is a small village in Monmouthshire, south east Wales, United Kingdom.

Location 

Maryland is located six miles south east of Monmouth.

History & Amenities 

Maryland is situated in what is now termed the Wye Valley Forest Park, the upland area overlooking the Wye Valley AONB and part of the Trellech ridge, a rural, partly wooded area of Monmouthshire.

External links
 www.geograph.co.uk : photos of Maryland and surrounding area
 Monmouthshire Green Web website on the Maryland Flower Meadows

Villages in Monmouthshire